Format of entries is:
 ICAO (IATA) – Airport Name – Airport Location

MB - Turks and Caicos Islands 

 MBAC       – Harold Charles International Airport – Ambergris Cay
 MBGT (GDT) – JAGS McCartney International Airport (Grand Turk Int'l) – Grand Turk Island
 MBMC (MDS) – Middle Caicos Airport – Middle Caicos
 MBNC (NCA) – North Caicos Airport – North Caicos
 MBPI (PIC) – Pine Cay Airport – Pine Cay
 MBPV (PLS) – Providenciales International Airport – Providenciales
 MBSC (XSC) – South Caicos Airport – South Caicos
 MBSY (SLX) – Salt Cay Airport – Salt Cay

MD - Dominican Republic 

 MDAB (EPS) – Arroyo Barril Airport – Samaná
 MDAD – Azua Dominica Airport – Azua
 MDAN – Angelina Airport – Cotuí
 MDBA – Batey Anita Airport – Consuelo
 MDBG – Baigua Airport – Higüey (closed)
 MDBH (BRX) – María Montez International Airport – Barahona
 MDBL – Batey Luisa Airport – Boca Chica
 MDCO – Consuelo Airport – Consuelo
 MDCR (CBJ) – Cabo Rojo Airport – Pedernales
 MDCY (AZS) – Samaná El Catey International Airport – Samaná
 MDCZ (COZ) – Constanza Airport – Constanza
 MDDJ (DAJ) – Dajabón Airport – Dajabón
 MDES – Esperanza Airport – Esperanza
 MDHE (HEX) – Herrera International Airport – Santo Domingo (closed February 2006)
 MDHN – Enriquillo Airport – Enriquillo
 MDIG (IGQ) – Ingenio Quisqueya Airport
 MDJB (JBQ) – La Isabela International Airport (Dr. Joaquín Balaguer) – Santo Domingo
 MDJI – Jimani Airport – Jimaní
 MDLM – Los Montones Airport – San Cristóbal
 MDLR (LRM) – La Romana International Airport – La Romana
 MDMC – Osvaldo Virgil Airport – Monte Cristi
 MDPC (PUJ) – Punta Cana International Airport – Punta Cana / Higüey
 MDPO (EPS) – El Portillo Airport – Samaná  (closed February 2012)
 MDPP (POP) – Puerto Plata Airport (Gregorio Luperón International Airport) – Puerto Plata
 MDSB (SNX) – Sabana de la Mar Airport – Sabana de la Mar
 MDSD (SDQ) – Las Américas-JFPG International Airport (Dr. José Fco. Peña Gómez) – Punta Caucedo (near Santo Domingo)
 MDSI (ZXD) – San Isidro Air Base – San Isidro
 MDSJ (SJM) – San Juan de la Maguana Airport – San Juan de la Maguana
 MDSP (SPM) – Cueva Las Maravillas Airport – San Pedro de Macorís
 MDST (STI) – Cibao International Airport (Santiago Municipal) – Santiago
 MDVA (LCT) – La Caleta Airport – La Romana
 MDWO – Walterio Airport – Monte Cristi

MG - Guatemala 

 MGBN       – Bananera Airport – Morales, Izabal
 MGCB (CBV) – Cobán Airport – Cobán, Alta Verapaz
 MGCR (CMM) – Carmelita Airport – Carmelita, El Petén
 MGCT (CTF) – Coatepeque Airport – Coatepeque, Quetzaltenango
 MGES       – Esquipulas Airport – Esquipulas, Chiquimula
 MGGT (GUA) – La Aurora International Airport – Guatemala City – Guatemala
 MGHT (HUG) – Huehuetenango Airport – Huehuetenango, Huehuetenango
 MGLL       – La Libertad Airport – La Libertad, El Petén
 MGML       – Malacatán Airport – Malacatán, San Marcos
 MGMM (FRS) – Mundo Maya International Airport – Flores, El Petén
 MGPB (PBR) – Puerto Barrios Airport – Puerto Barrios, Izabal
 MGPP (PON) – Poptún Airport – Poptún, El Petén
 MGQC (AQB) – Quiché Airport – Quiché, El Quiché
 MGQZ (AAZ) – Quetzaltenango Airport – Quetzaltenango, Quetzaltenango
 MGRB (RUV) – Rubelsanto Airport – Rubelsanto, Alta Verapaz
 MGRT (RER) – Retalhuleu Airport / Base Aérea del Sur – Retalhuleu, Retalhuleu
 MGSJ       – San José Airport – Puerto San José, Escuintla
 MGSM       – San Marcos Airport – San Marcos, San Marcos
 MGZA       – Zacapa Airport – Zacapa, Zacapa

MH - Honduras 

 MHAM – Amapala Airport – Amapala
 MHCG – Comayagua Airport – Comayagua
 MHCH – Choluteca Airport – Choluteca
 MHCT – Puerto Castilla Airport – Puerto Castilla
 MHDU – Mocorón Airport (Durzona) – Mocorón (not to be confused w/MHOR - Mocorón Airport)
 MHEA (OAN) – El Arrayán Airport – Olanchito
 MHGE (CAA) – El Aguacate Airport – Catacamas
 MHIC – Islas del Cisne Airport – Islas del Cisne
 MHJU (JUT) – Juticalpa Airport – Juticalpa
 MHLC (LCE) – Golosón International Airport – La Ceiba
 MHLE (LEZ) – La Esperanza Airport – La Esperanza / Intibucá (not to be confused w/MHEZ - La Esperanza Airport)
 MHLM (SAP) – La Mesa International Airport (Ramón Villeda Morales International Airport) – San Pedro Sula
 MHMA (MRJ) – Marcala Airport – Marcala
 MHNJ (GJA) – Guanaja Airport – Guanaja
 MHNV – Nueva Ocotepeque Airport – Nueva Ocotepeque
 MHPE – El Progreso Airport – El Progreso
 MHPL (PEU) – Puerto Lempira Airport – Puerto Lempira
 MHPU – Puerto Cortes Airport – Puerto Cortes
 MHRO (RTB) – Juan Manuel Gálvez International Airport – Roatán
 MHRU (RUY) – Copán Ruinas Airport – Copán Ruinas
 MHSB – Santa Bárbara Airport – Santa Bárbara (not to be confused w/MHBC - Santa Bárbara Airport)
 MHSC (XPL) – Palmerola Air Base (Coronel Enrique Soto Cano Air Base) – Comayagua
 MHSR (SDH) – Santa Rosa de Copán Airport – Santa Rosa de Copán (defunct)
 MHTE (TEA) – Tela Airport – Tela
 MHTG (TGU) – Toncontín International Airport (Teniente Coronel Hernán Acosta Mejía Airport) – Tegucigalpa
 MHTJ (TJI) – Trujillo Airport – Trujillo
 MHUT (UII) – Útila Airport – Útila
 MHYR (ORO) – Yoro Airport – Yoro

MK - Jamaica 

 MKBS (OCJ) – Ian Fleming International Airport – Boscobel, Ocho Rios
 MKJP (KIN) – Norman Manley International Airport – Kingston
 MKJS (MBJ) – Sangster International Airport – Montego Bay
 MKKJ (POT) – Ken Jones Aerodrome – Port Antonio
 MKNG (NEG) – Negril Aerodrome – Negril
 MKTP (KTP) – Tinson Pen Aerodrome – Kingston

MM - Mexico

 MMAA (ACA) – Acapulco International Airport (General Juan N. Álvarez International Airport) – Acapulco, Guerrero
 MMAN (NTR) – Del Norte International Airport – Monterrey, Nuevo León
 MMAS (AGU) – Aguascalientes International Airport (Lic. Jesús Terán Peredo International Airport) – Aguascalientes City, Aguascalientes
 MMBT (HUX) – Bahías de Huatulco International Airport – Huatulco, Oaxaca
 MMCB (CVJ) – Cuernavaca Airport (General Mariano Matamoros International Airport) – Cuernavaca, Morelos
 MMCC (ACN) – Ciudad Acuña International Airport – Ciudad Acuña, Coahuila
 MMCE (CME) – Ciudad del Carmen International Airport – Ciudad del Carmen, Campeche
 MMCG (NCG) – Nuevo Casas Grandes Municipal Airport – Nuevo Casas Grandes, Chihuahua
 MMCL (CUL) – Culiacán International Airport (Federal de Bachigualato International Airport) – Culiacán, Sinaloa
 MMCM (CTM) – Chetumal International Airport – Chetumal, Quintana Roo
 MMCN (CEN) – Ciudad Obregón International Airport – Ciudad Obregón, Sonora
 MMCP (CPE) – Campeche International Airport (Ing. Alberto Acuña Ongay International Airport) – Campeche, Campeche
 MMCS (CJS) – Ciudad Juárez International Airport (Abraham González International Airport) – Ciudad Juárez, Chihuahua
 MMCT (CZA) – Chichen Itza International Airport – Chichen Itza, Yucatán
 MMCU (CUU) – Chihuahua International Airport (General Roberto Fierro Villalobos International Airport) – Chihuahua, Chihuahua
 MMCV (CVM) – Ciudad Victoria International Airport (General Pedro J. Méndez International Airport) – Ciudad Victoria, Tamaulipas
 MMCY (CYW) – Captain Rogelio Castillo National Airport – Celaya, Guanajuato
 MMCZ (CZM) – Cozumel International Airport – Cozumel, Quintana Roo
 MMDO (DGO) – Durango International Airport (General Guadalupe Victoria International Airport) – Durango, Durango
 MMEP (TPQ) – Tepic International Airport (Amado Nervo International Airport) – Tepic, Nayarit
 MMES (ESE) – Ensenada Airport – Ensenada, Baja California
 MMGL (GDL) – Guadalajara International Airport (Don Miguel Hidalgo y Costilla International Airport) – Guadalajara, Jalisco
 MMGM (GYM) – Guaymas International Airport (General José María Yáñez International Airport) – Guaymas, Sonora
 MMGR (GUB) – Guerrero Negro Airport – Guerrero Negro, Baja California Sur
 MMHO (HMO) – Hermosillo International Airport (General Ignacio Pesqueira Garcia International Airport) – Hermosillo, Sonora
 MMIA (CLQ) – Colima Airport (Lic. Miguel de la Madrid Airport) – Colima, Colima
 MMIO (SLW) – Saltillo Airport (Plan de Guadalupe International Airport) – Saltillo, Coahuila
 MMJA (JAL) – El Lencero Airport – Jalapa (Xalapa), Veracruz
 MMLC (LZC) – Lázaro Cárdenas Airport – Lázaro Cárdenas, Michoacán
 MMLM (LMM) – Los Mochis International Airport (Federal del Valle del Fuerte International Airport) – Los Mochis, Sinaloa
 MMLO (BJX) – Aeropuerto Internacional de Guanajuato (known as Del Bajío) – Silao, Guanajuato
 MMLP (LAP) – La Paz International Airport (Manuel Márquez de León International Airport) – La Paz, Baja California Sur
 MMLT (LTO) – Loreto International Airport – Loreto, Baja California Sur
 MMMA (MAM) – Matamoros International Airport (General Servando Canales International Airport) – Matamoros, Tamaulipas
 MMMD (MID) – Mérida International Airport (Manuel Crescencio Rejón International Airport) – Mérida, Yucatán
 MMML (MXL) – Mexicali International Airport (General Rodolfo Sánchez Taboada International Airport) – Mexicali, Baja California
 MMMM (MLM) – General Francisco J. Mujica International Airport – Morelia, Michoacán
 MMMT (MTT) – Minatitlán/Coatzacoalcos International Airport – Minatitlán, Veracruz
 MMMV (LOV) – Monclova International Airport (Venustiano Carranza International Airport) – Monclova, Coahuila
 MMMX (MEX) – Mexico City International Airport (Lic. Benito Juárez International Airport) – Mexico City, Distrito Federal
 MMMY (MTY) – Monterrey International Airport (General Mariano Escobedo International Airport) – Monterrey, Nuevo León
 MMMZ (MZT) – Mazatlán International Airport (General Rafael Buelna International Airport) – Mazatlán, Sinaloa
 MMNL (NLD) – Nuevo Laredo International Airport (Quetzalcóatl International Airport) – Nuevo Laredo, Tamaulipas
 MMOX (OAX) – Xoxocotlán International Airport – Oaxaca, Oaxaca
 MMPA (PAZ) – El Tajín National Airport – Poza Rica, Veracruz
 MMPB (PBC) – Puebla International Airport (Hermanos Serdán International Airport) – Puebla, Puebla
 MMPE (PPE) – Mar de Cortés International Airport – Puerto Peñasco, Sonora
 MMPG (PDS) – Piedras Negras International Airport – Piedras Negras, Coahuila
 MMPN (UPN) – Uruapan International Airport (Lic. y Gen. Ignacio López Rayón Airport) – Uruapan, Michoacán
 MMPQ (PQM) – Palenque International Airport – Palenque, Chiapas
 MMPR (PVR) – Licenciado Gustavo Díaz Ordaz International Airport – Puerto Vallarta, Jalisco
 MMPS (PXM) – Puerto Escondido International Airport – Puerto Escondido, Oaxaca
 MMQT (QRO) – Querétaro Intercontinental Airport (formerly Ing. Fernando Espinoza Gutiérrez International Airport) – Querétaro, Querétaro
 MMRX (REX) – General Lucio Blanco International Airport (Reynosa International Airport) – Reynosa, Tamaulipas
 MMSC (SZT) – San Cristóbal de las Casas National Airport– San Cristobal de las Casas, Chiapas (closed in 2010)
 MMSD (SJD) – Los Cabos International Airport – San José del Cabo, Baja California Sur
 MMSF (SFH) – San Felipe International Airport – San Felipe, Baja California
 MMSL       – Cabo San Lucas International Airport – Cabo San Lucas, Baja California Sur

 MMSM (NLU) – Santa Lucía Air Force Base Num. 1 – Zumpango, Estado de Mexico
 MMSP (SLP) – San Luis Potosí International Airport (Ponciano Arriaga International Airport) – San Luis Potosí, San Luis Potosí
 MMSZ (SCX) – Salina Cruz Airport – Salina Cruz, Oaxaca
 MMTC (TRC) – Torreón International Airport (Francisco Sarabia International Airport) – Torreón, Coahuila
 MMTG (TGZ) – Tuxtla Gutiérrez International Airport (Angel Albino Corzo International Airport) – Tuxtla Gutiérrez, Chiapas
 MMTJ (TIJ) – Tijuana International Airport (General Abelardo L. Rodríguez International Airport) – Tijuana, Baja California
 MMTM (TAM) – Tampico International Airport (General Francisco Javier Mina International Airport) – Tampico, Tamaulipas
 MMTN (TSL) – Tamuín National Airport – Tamuín, San Luis Potosí
 MMTO (TLC) – Toluca International Airport (Lic. Adolfo López Mateos International Airport) – Toluca, Estado de México
 MMTP (TAP) – Tapachula International Airport – Tapachula, Chiapas
 MMUN (CUN) – Cancún International Airport – Cancún, Quintana Roo
 MMVA (VSA) – Villahermosa International Airport (Carlos Rovirosa Pérez International Airport) – Villahermosa, Tabasco
 MMVR (VER) – Veracruz International Airport (General Heriberto Jara International Airport) – Veracruz, Veracruz
 MMZC (ZCL) – Zacatecas International Airport (General Leobardo C. Ruiz International Airport) (La Calera Airport) – Zacatecas, Zacatecas
 MMZH (ZIH) – Ixtapa-Zihuatanejo International Airport – Ixtapa–Zihuatanejo, Guerrero
 MMZO (ZLO) – Playa de Oro International Airport – Manzanillo, Colima

MN - Nicaragua 

 MNAL – Alamikamba Airport – Alamikamba, Prinzapolka RAAN (Zelaya)
 MNAM – Altamira Airport – Altamira, Boaco
 MNBC – Boaco Airport – Boaco, Boaco
 MNBL (BEF) – Bluefields International Airport – Bluefields, RAAS (Zelaya)
 MNBR – Los Brasiles Airport – Los Brasiles, Managua
 MNBZ (BZA) – San Pedro Airport – Bonanza, RAAN (Zelaya)
 MNCE (ECI) – Emerald Coast Airport – Tola, Rivas
 MNCH – Chinandega Airport – Chinandega, Chinandega
 MNCI (RNI) – Corn Island Airport – Corn Island, RAAS (Zelaya)
 MNCT – Corinto Airport – Corinto, Chinandega
 MNDM – Dos Montes Airport – Dos Montes, León
 MNEP – La Esperanza Airport – La Esperanza, RAAS (Zelaya)
 MNES – Estelí Airport – Estelí, Estelí (defunct) 
 MNFC – Punta Huete Airport (Panchito) – Punta Huete, San Francisco Libre, Managua
 MNFF – El Bluff Airport – El Bluff, RAAS (Zelaya) (defunct)
 MNHG – Hato Grande Airport – Hato Grande, Chontales
 MNJG – Jinotega Airport – Jinotega, Jinotega
 MNJU – Juigalpa Airport – Juigalpa, Chontales
 MNKW – Karawala Airport – Karawala, RAAS (Zelaya)
 MNLL – Las Lajas Airport – Las Lajas, Granada
 MNLN – León Airport (Fanor Urroz) – León, León
 MNLP – Ometepe Airport – Ometepe, Rivas
 MNMA – Macantaca Airport – Macantaca (Makantaca), RAAN (Zelaya)
 MNMG (MGA) – Managua International Airport (Augusto Cesar Sandino International Airport) – Managua, Managua
 MNMR – Montelimar Airport – San Rafael del Sur, Managua
 MNNG (NVG) – Nueva Guinea Airport – Nueva Guinea, RAAS (Zelaya) (defunct)
 MNMT – La Cumplida Airport – La Cumplida, Matagalpa
 MNPA – Palcasa Airport – El Castillo, Río San Juan
 MNPC (PUZ) – Bilwi Airport (Puerto Cabezas Airport) – Bilwi, RAAN (Zelaya)
 MNPG – Pikin Guerrero Airport – Pikin Guerrero, Chontales
 MNPP – El Papalonal Airport – El Papalonal, León
 MNPR – Palo Ralo Airport – Palo Ralo, Río San Juan
 MNRS – Rivas Airport – Rivas, Rivas
 MNRT – Rosita Airport – Rosita, RAAN (Zelaya)
 MNRV – Morgan's Rock Airport – San Juan del Sur, Rivas
 MNSC – San Carlos Airport – San Carlos, Río San Juan
 MNSI (SIU) – Siuna Airport – Siuna, RAAN (Zelaya)
 MNSN – San Juan de Nicaragua Airport – San Juan de Nicaragua, Río San Juan
 MNWP (WSP) – Waspam Airport – Waspam, RAAN (Zelaya)

MP - Panama 

 MPBO (BOC) – Bocas del Toro "Isla Colón" International Airport (José Ezequiel Hall International Airport) – Bocas del Toro
 MPCE (CTD) – Chitré Alonso Valderrama Airport – Chitré
 MPCH (CHX) – Captain Manuel Niño International Airport – Changuinola
 MPCL       – Calzada Larga Airport – Calzada Larga
 MPCM       – Chame Airport – Chame
 MPDA (DAV) – Enrique Malek International Airport – David
 MPEJ (ONX) – Enrique Adolfo Jiménez Airport – Colón
 MPFE       – Fernando Eleta Airport – Isla Pedro Gonzalez
 MPFS       – Fort Sherman Airport – Fort Sherman
 MPHO (BLB) – Howard Air Force Base – Balboa (redesignated MPPA: Panama Pacifico International Airport)
 MPJE (JQE) – Jaqué Airport – Jaqué
 MPLP (PLP) – Captain Ramon Xatruch Airport – La Palma (defunct)
 MPMF       – Miraflores Airport – La Palma
 MPMG (PAC) – Albrook "Marcos A. Gelabert" International Airport – Panama City
 MPMI (NMG) – San Miguel Airport – San Miguel
 MPNU       – Augusto Vergara Airport – Los Santos
 MPOA (PUE) – Puerto Obaldia Airport – Puerto Obaldia
 MPPA (BLB) – Panamá Pacífico International Airport (formerly Howard Air Force Base) – Balboa
 MPSA (SYP) – Ruben Cantu Airport – Santiago
 MPSB (SAX) – Sambú Airport – Sambú
 MPSM (RIH) – Scarlett Martínez International Airport (Río Hato Airport) – Rio Hato
 MPTO (PTY) – Tocumen International Airport – Panama City
 MPVR (PVE) – El Porvenir Airport – El Porvenir
 MPWN (NBL) – Wannukandi Airport – Wannukandi, Guna Yala

MR - Costa Rica 

 MRAN (FON) – La Fortuna Arenal Airport – La Fortuna
 MRAO (TTQ) – Barra de Tortuguero Airport – Tortuguero
 MRBA (BAI) – Buenos Aires Airport – Buenos Aires
 MRBC (BCL) – Barra del Colorado Airport – Barra del Colorado
 MRCA (CSC) – Codela Airport – Pocora
 MRCC (OTR) – Coto 47 Airport – Coto 47
 MRCH – Chacarita Airport – Chacarita
 MRCR (PLD) – Carrillo Airport – Puerto Carrillo
 MRCV – Cabo Velas Airport – Playa Grande
 MRDK (DRK) – Bahía Drake Airport (Drake Bay Airport) – Bahia Drake
 MRDO – Dieciocho Airport (military) – Dieciocho
 MREC – El Carmen de Siquirres Airport – El Carmen
 MRFI – Nuevo Palmar Sur Airport – Nuevo Palmar Sur
 MRFS – Finca 63 Airport – Finca 63
 MRGF (GLF) – Golfito Airport – Golfito
 MRGP (GPL) – Guápiles Airport – Guápiles
 MRIA (PBP) – Punta Islita Airport – Corozalito
 MRLB (LIR) – Daniel Oduber Quirós International Airport – Liberia
 MRLC (LSL) – Los Chiles Airport – Los Chiles
 MRLE – Laurel Airport – Laurel
 MRLF – La Flor Airport – La Flor
 MRLM (LIO) – Limón International Airport – Limón
 MRLP (LSP) – Las Piedras Airport – Cañas
 MRLT – Las Trancas Airport – Las Trancas, Guanacaste
 MRNC (NCT) – Nicoya Guanacaste Airport – Nicoya
 MRNS (NOB) – Nosara Airport – Nosara
 MROC (SJO) – Juan Santamaría International Airport – San José
 MRPA – Palo Arco Airport – Palo Arco
 MRPD – Pandora Airport – Pandora
 MRPJ (PJM) – Puerto Jiménez Airport – Puerto Jimenez
 MRPM (PMZ) – Palmar Sur Airport – Palmar Sur
 MRPV (SYQ) – Tobías Bolaños International Airport – San José
 MRQP (XQP) – Quepos La Managua Airport – Quepos
 MRRF (RFR) – Rio Frio Airport – Rio Frio / Progreso
 MRSA – San Alberto Airport – Siquirres
 MRSG – Santa Clara de Guapiles Airport – Humo
 MRSI  – San Isidro de El General Airport – San Isidro de El General
 MRSL – Salama Airport – Salama
 MRSN – Sirena Aerodrome – Corcovado National Park
 MRSO – Santa Maria de Guacimo Airport – Santa Maria de Guacimo
 MRSV (TOO) – San Vito de Java Airport – San Vito
 MRTM (TNO) – Tamarindo Airport – Tamarindo
 MRTR (TMU) – Tambor Airport – Tambor
 MRTS – Santa Teresa Airport, Costa Rica – Santa Teresa
 MRUP (UPL) – Upala Airport – Upala

MS - El Salvador 

 MSBS – Barrillas Airport – Usulután
 MSCD – Ceiba Doblada Airport – Ceiba Doblada
 MSCH – La Chepona Airport – La Chepona
 MSCM – Corral de Mulas Airport – Corral de Mulas
 MSCN – Casas Nuevas Airport – Jiquilisco
 MSCR – La Carrera Airport – Jiquilisco
 MSCS – Las Cachas Airport – Cangrejera
 MSEJ – El Jocotillo Airport – Acajutla
 MSER – Entre Rios Airport (General Justo José de Urquiza Airport) – Entre Rios
 MSES – Espiritu Santo Airport – Espiritu Santo
 MSET – El Tamarindo Airport – El Tamarindo
 MSLC – La Cabaña Airport – La Cabaña
 MSLD – Los Comandos Airport – San Francisco Gotera
 MSLP (SAL) – El Salvador International Airport (San Óscar Arnulfo Romero y Galdámez International) – San Salvador
 MSPT – El Platanar Airport – El Platanar
 MSRC – El Ronco Airport – El Ronco (closed)
 MSSA – El Palmer Airport – Santa Ana
 MSSJ – Punta San Juan Airport – Corral de Mulas
 MSSM – El Papalon Airport – San Miguel
 MSSS – Ilopango International Airport – San Salvador
 MSZT – El Zapote Airport – El Zapote

MT - Haiti 

 MTCA (CYA) – Antoine-Simon Airport – Les Cayes
 MTCH (CAP) – Cap-Haïtien International Airport – Cap-Haïtien
 MTJA (JAK) – Jacmel Airport – Jacmel
 MTJE (JEE) – Jérémie Airport – Jérémie
 MTPP (PAP) – Toussaint Louverture International Airport – Port-au-Prince
 MTPX (PAX) – Port-de-Paix Airport – Port-de-Paix

MU - Cuba 

 MUBA (BCA) – Gustavo Rizo Airport – Baracoa, Guantánamo
 MUBR       – Las Brujas Airport – Cayo Santa Maria, Villa Clara
 MUBY (BYM) – Carlos Manuel de Céspedes Airport – Bayamo, Granma
 MUCA (AVI) – Máximo Gómez Airport – Ciego de Ávila, Ciego de Ávila
 MUCB    – Caibarién Airport – Caibarién, Villa Clara (abandoned)
 MUCC (CCC) – Jardines del Rey Airport – Cayo Coco, Ciego de Ávila
 MUCF (CFG) – Jaime González Airport – Cienfuegos, Cienfuegos
 MUCL (CYO) – Vilo Acuña Airport (Juan Vitalio Acuña Airport) – Cayo Largo del Sur, Isla de la Juventud
 MUCM (CMW) – Ignacio Agramonte International Airport – Camagüey, Camagüey
 MUCO       – Colón Airport – Colón, Matanzas
 MUCU (SCU) – Antonio Maceo Airport – Santiago de Cuba, Santiago de Cuba
 MUFL       – Florida Airport – Florida, Camagüey
 MUGM (NBW) – Leeward Point Field (US Naval Station Guantanamo Bay) – Guantánamo Bay, Guantánamo (military)
 MUGT (GAO) – Mariana Grajales Airport – Guantánamo, Guantánamo
 MUGV       – Guardalavaca Airport – Guardalavaca, Holguín
 MUHA (HAV) – José Martí International Airport (Rancho-Boyeros Airport) – Havana, Havana (La Habana)
 MUHG (HOG) – Frank País Airport – Holguín, Holguín
 MUKW (VRO) – Kawama Airport – Varadero, Matanzas
 MULB       – Ciudad Libertad Airport – Havana, Havana (La Habana) (military)
 MULM (LCL) – La Coloma Airport – Pinar del Río, Pinar del Río
 MUMA (UMA) – Punta de Maisí Airport – Maisí, Guantánamo
 MUMG       – Managua Airport – Managua; Havana (military)
 MUML    – Mariel Airport – Mariel, Havana (La Habana) (closed)
 MUMO (MOA) – Orestes Acosta Airport – Moa, Holguín
 MUMZ (MZO) – Sierra Maestra Airport – Manzanillo, Granma
 MUNB (QSN) – San Nicolás de Bari Airport – San Nicolás de Bari, Havana (La Habana)
 MUNC (ICR) – Nicaro Airport – Nicaro (abandoned)
 MUNG (GER) – Rafael Cabrera Mustelier Airport – Nueva Gerona, Isla de la Juventud
 MUOC    – Cayo Coco Airport – Cayo Coco, Ciego de Ávila (abandoned)
 MUPB (UPB) – Playa Baracoa Airport – Havana, Havana (La Habana) (military)
 MUPR (QPD) – Pinar del Río Airport – Pinar del Río, Pinar del Río (defunct)
 MUSA       – San Antonio de los Baños Air Base – San Antonio de los Baños, Havana (La Habana) (military)
 MUSC (SNU) – Abel Santamaría Airport – Santa Clara, Villa Clara
 MUSJ (SNJ) – San Julian Air Base – Pinar del Río, Pinar del Río (military)
 MUSL       – Joaquín de Agüero Airport (Santa Lucia Airport) – Santa Lucia, Camagüey
 MUSN (SZJ) – Siguanea Airport – Isla de la Juventud
 MUSS (USS) – Sancti Spíritus Airport – Sancti Spíritus, Sancti Spíritus
 MUTD (TND) – Alberto Delgado Airport – Trinidad, Sancti Spíritus
 MUVR (VRA) – Juan Gualberto Gómez Airport – Varadero, Matanzas
 MUVT (VTU) – Hermanos Ameijeiras Airport – Victoria de Las Tunas, Las Tunas

MW - Cayman Islands 

 MWCB (CYB) – Sir Charles Kirkconnell International Airport – Cayman Brac
 MWCG – George Town Heliport (Metropolitan Area) – George Town, Grand Cayman
 MWCL (LYB) – Edward Bodden Airfield (Little Cayman Airport) – Little Cayman
 MWCR (GCM) – Owen Roberts International Airport – George Town, Grand Cayman

MY - Bahamas 

 MYAB (MAY) – Clarence A. Bain Airport – Mangrove Cay, Andros
 MYAF (ASD) – Andros Town International Airport (Fresh Creek Airport) – Andros Town, Andros
 MYAG – Castaway Cay Airport (private) – Castaway Cay (Gorda Cay), Abaco
 MYAK (TZN) – South Andros Airport (Congo Town Airport) – Congo Town, Andros
 MYAM (MHH) – Leonard M. Thompson International Airport – Marsh Harbour, Abaco
 MYAN (SAQ) – San Andros Airport – Nicholls Town, Andros
 MYAO – Mores Island Airport (Moores Island Airport) – Moore's Island, Abaco
 MYAP (AXP) – Spring Point Airport – Spring Point, Acklins
 MYAS – Sandy Point Airport – Sandy Point, Abaco
 MYAT (TCB) – Treasure Cay Airport – Treasure Cay, Abaco
 MYAW (WKR) – Walker's Cay Airport – Walker's Cay, Abaco
 MYAX – Spanish Cay Airport – Spanish Cay, Abaco
 MYBC (CCZ) – Chub Cay International Airport – Chub Cay, Berry Islands
 MYBG (GHC) – Great Harbour Cay Airport – Great Harbour Cay, Berry Islands
 MYBO – Ocean Cay Airport (private) – Ocean Cay, Bimini
 MYBS (BIM) – South Bimini Airport – South Bimini, Bimini
 MYBW – Big Whale Cay Airport – Big Whale Cay, Berry Islands
 MYBX – Little Whale Cay Airport (private) – Little Whale Cay, Berry Islands
 MYCA (ATC) – Arthur's Town Airport – Arthur's Town, Cat Island
 MYCB (TBI) – New Bight Airport – New Bight, Cat Island
 MYCC – Cat Cay Airport (private) – North Cat Cay, Bimini
 MYCH – Hawks Nest Airport (Hawk's Nest Creek Airport) – Hawks Nest, Cat Island
 MYCI (CRI) – Colonel Hill Airport (Crooked Island Airport) – Colonel Hill, Crooked Island
 MYCP – Pitts Town Airport (Pitts Town Point Airport) – Pitts Town, Crooked Island
 MYCS – Cay Sal Airport (private) – Cay Sal
 MYCX – Cutlass Bay Airport – Cutlass Bay, Cat Island
 MYEB – Black Point Airport – Black Point, Exuma
 MYEC (CEL) – Cape Eleuthera Airport – Cape Eleuthera, Eleuthera (closed)
 MYEF (GGT) – Exuma International Airport – Moss Town, Exuma
 MYEG – George Town Airport – George Town, Exuma (defunct)
 MYEH (ELH) – North Eleuthera Airport – North Eleuthera, Eleuthera
 MYEL – Lee Stocking Airport – Lee Stocking, Exuma
 MYEM (GHB) – Governor's Harbour Airport – Governor's Harbour, Eleuthera
 MYEN (NMC) – Norman's Cay Airport – Norman's Cay, Exuma
 MYER (RSD) – Rock Sound International Airport – Rock Sound, Eleuthera
 MYES (TYM) – Staniel Cay Airport – Staniel Cay, Exuma
 MYEY – Hog Cay Airport (private) – Hog Cay, Exuma
 MYGF (FPO) – Grand Bahama International Airport (Freeport International Airport) – Freeport, Grand Bahama
 MYGW (WTD) – West End Airport – West End, Grand Bahama
 MYIG (IGA) – Inagua Airport (Matthew Town Airport) – Matthew Town, Inagua
 MYLD (LGI) – Deadman's Cay Airport – Deadman's Cay, Long Island
 MYLM – Cape Santa Maria Airport – Cape Santa Maria, Long Island (closed)
 MYLR – Hard Bargain Airport – Long Island
 MYLS (SML) – Stella Maris Airport – Stella Maris, Long Island
 MYMM (MYG) – Mayaguana Airport – Mayaguana
 MYNN (NAS) – Lynden Pindling International Airport (formerly Nassau International Airport) – Nassau, New Providence
 MYPI (PID) – New Providence Airport – Paradise Island, New Providence (closed 1999)
 MYRD (DCT) – Duncan Town Airport – Duncan Town, Ragged Island
 MYRP – Port Nelson Airport – Port Nelson, Rum Cay
 MYSM (ZSA) – San Salvador Airport (Cockburn Town Airport) – Cockburn Town, San Salvador Island

MZ - Belize 

 MZBB – Blackbird Caye Airstrip – Turneffe Atoll
 MZBE (TZA) – Sir Barry Bowen Municipal Airport – Belize City
 MZBG (BGK) – Big Creek Airport – Big Creek
 MZBP (BCV) – Hector Silva Airstrip – Belmopan
 MZBZ (BZE) – Philip S. W. Goldson International Airport – Belize City
 MZCF (SQS) – Matthew Spain Airport – San Ignacio
 MZCK (CUK) – Caye Caulker Airport – Caye Caulker
 MZCP (CYC) – Caye Chapel Airport – Caye Chapel
 MZCZ (CZH) – Corozal Airport (Ranchito Airport) – Corozal
 MZGJ – Chan Chich Airstrip – Gallon Jug
 MZJC – Johnny Chan Chen Airstrip – Chan Chen
 MZKT (SVK) – Silver Creek Airport – Silver Creek
 MZLH – Northern Two Cayes Airstrip – Northern Caye
 MZMF (CYD) – San Ignacio Town Airstrip (Maya Flats Airport) – San Ignacio
 MZML (MDB) – Melinda Airport – Hope Creek
 MZPB (DGA) – Dangriga Airport (Pelican Beach Airstrip) – Dangriga
 MZPG (PND) – Punta Gorda Airport – Punta Gorda
 MZPL (PLJ) – Placencia Airport – Placencia
 MZSJ (SJX) – Sarteneja Airport – Sarteneja
 MZSL (MZE) – Manatee Airport (Spanish Lookout Airport) – Spanish Lookout
 MZSP (SPR) – John Greif II Airport – San Pedro
 MZSV (INB) – Independence Airport (Mango Creek Airport/Savannah Airport) – Independence and Mango Creek
 MZTH (ORZ) – Alfredo Martinez Chan Pine Ridge Airstrip (Tower Hill Airport) – Orange Walk Town

References

 
  - includes IATA codes
 Aviation Safety Network - IATA and ICAO airport codes

M
ICAO
Airports
Airports
Airports
Airports
Airports
Airports
Airports
Airports